Niedźwiada  is a village in Lubartów County, Lublin Voivodeship, in eastern Poland, about 10 km north of Lubartów and 30 km north of Lublin. It is the seat of the gmina (administrative district) called Gmina Niedźwiada. It has a population of approximately 1,200.

Under current plans, an international airport serving the city of Lublin will be built near the village in the next few years.

References
 Gmina Niedźwiada
 Airport Niedźwiada

Villages in Lubartów County